Semniomima mediana is a moth in the family Crambidae. It was described by Schaus in 1904. It is found in Brazil (Parana).

References

Moths described in 1904
Pyraustinae